NGC 768 is a barred spiral galaxy located in the constellation Cetus about 314 million light years from the Milky Way. It was discovered by the American astronomer Lewis Swift in 1885.

See also 
 List of NGC objects (1–1000)

References

External links 
 

Barred spiral galaxies
0768
Cetus (constellation)
007465